Dali is a town under the administration of Beiliu, Guangxi, China. , it administers the following 16 villages:
Dali Village
Luoyang Village
Shalie Village
Liudui Village
Xiaoma Village
Lindong Village
Guantang Village
Gaodong Village
Liuma Village
Yuetang Village
Datang Village
Luopo Village
Guhong Village
Yongxi Village
Lin Village
Liuhou Village

References 

Towns of Guangxi
Beiliu